The year 2014 in Japanese music.

Events
65th NHK Kōhaku Uta Gassen

Number-ones
Oricon number-one albums
Oricon number-one singles
Hot 100 number-one singles

Awards
2014 MTV Video Music Awards Japan

Debuting artists

Albums released

January

February

March

April

May

June

July

August

September

October

November

December

See also
 2014 in Japan
 2014 in Japanese television
 List of Japanese films of 2014

References